Sainammin Saenya (born 30 August 1998) is a Thai cricketer. She played for the Thailand women's national cricket team in the 2017 Women's Cricket World Cup Qualifier in February 2017. In June 2018, she was named in Thailand's squad for the 2018 ICC Women's World Twenty20 Qualifier tournament. She made her Women's Twenty20 International (WT20I) debut for Thailand on 3 June 2018, in the 2018 Women's Twenty20 Asia Cup.

References

External links
 

1998 births
Living people
Sainammin Saenya
Sainammin Saenya
Place of birth missing (living people)
Cricketers at the 2014 Asian Games
Sainammin Saenya
Southeast Asian Games medalists in cricket
Competitors at the 2017 Southeast Asian Games
Sainammin Saenya